Harry Trout may refer to:

 Harry E. Trout (1876–1941), head college football coach for the West Virginia University Mountaineers in 1903
 Harry L. Trout, American mayor of Lancaster, Pennsylvania (1915–1920)